Sighthill Cemetery is an active cemetery in central Glasgow, Scotland dating from 1840. It has an operational crematorium. It lies within the Sighthill neighbourhood on the A803 Springburn Road between Cowlairs Park and Petershill Park, north of Glasgow city centre, bounded to the north by Keppochhill Road.

History
Sighthill Cemetery was laid out on former farmland linked to the Fountainwell Farm in 1839/40.

The first burial was on 24 April 1840. The cemetery is laid out in an informal pattern with serpentine paths, typical of the first British cemeteries.

The cemetery contains 116 war graves.

The cemetery itself is a listed entity, and its entrance lodge with gates and the Martyrs' Monument (see below) and all with Category B status.

Notable burials
  George A. Walker Arnott (1799-1868) botanist
 Andrew Bonar (1810–1892), Moderator of the Free Church of Scotland
 Thomas Barclay (1792–1873), Principal of Glasgow University
 James Hedderwick (1814–1897), newspaper editor
 Robert Jamieson (1802–1880), Moderator of the General Assembly of the Church of Scotland
 John Mossman (1817–1890), sculptor
 William Mossman (1793–1851), sculptor
 James Seaton Reid (1798–1851), Irish-born academic
 Sarah West (1790–1876), actress
 William Rae Wilson (1817–1893), social reformer

Other memorials
Monument dating from 1847 to the leaders of the 1820 Radical War (otherwise known as the 1820 Insurrection), including John Baird (1790–1820) and Andrew Hardie. Although several records state that those executed were re-interred at Sighthill that is neither likely nor what the monument itself says.

References

External links
 
 

Cemeteries in Scotland
1840 establishments in Scotland
Category B listed buildings in Glasgow
Springburn